Limnu is an online whiteboarding app founded in 2015 by David Debry and David Hart. It allows users to draw on virtual whiteboards and invite others by e-mail or by sharing a link. Invitees see any changes to the board in real time and, if allowed by the owner of the board, can also draw on the board. The service is accessible through a web application in desktop and mobile web browsers, as well as through an iOS application.

History

Limnu is a software development firm founded by David Hart in 2015. It is headquartered in San Mateo, California.

In 2018, ZipSocket, a maker of online meeting software acquired Limnu.

Staff Directory

 Andrew Kunz - CEO & Founder
 Jenny Rice - Product Manager
 Max Requenes - Software Engineer
 Henry Maguire - Machine Learning Engineer

References

Software companies based in Utah
Web applications
Cloud applications
Software companies of the United States

External links